Tamil Nadu State Transport Corporation Ltd. - (TNSTC) is a Government owned public transport bus operator in Tamil Nadu, India. It operates Intercity bus services to cities within Tamil Nadu, and from Tamil Nadu to its neighbouring states. It also operates town busses from major cities and towns of Tamil Nadu to its neighborhoods, with the exception of Chennai, where the public bus service is operated by MTC, a subsidiary of TNSTC. It is the largest government bus transport corporation in India, and the biggest corporation in the world.

History
The planning concussion, in consultation with this ministry, have advised the state government to set up a road transport corporation under the Transport Corporations Act and the matter is under the consideration of the state government. Operation of nationalized transport services through a corporation is favoured so as to achieve railroad coordination, and to ensure operation on business lines. The general policy of the government is to establish corporations and the planning commission have advised that if the state governments want to nationalise the road services, they should form corporations and they should not be run as far as possible through government departments. It has also been suggested by the planning commission that the railways should participate or contribute to the state governments for running all the nationalised road services only when they decide to set up a corporation.

About
TNSTC is fully owned and operated by the Government of Tamil Nadu. TNSTC has started online booking facilities to book bus tickets between major cities served by TNSTC. It caters to all the districts within Tamil Nadu and also operates services to neighboring states of Andhra Pradesh, Karnataka, Kerala and union territory of Puduchery. Until 1997, the transport corporation was divided into 21 divisions which was later merged to form eight divisions. TNSTC owns 321 depots and five workshops with a combined fleet strength of 21,678 buses. TNSTC also offers contract and tourist services. Every bus owned by the corporation displays a portrait of Tamil poet Thiruvalluvar along with a two-line verse from Thirukkural inside the bus.

Present day Corporations and its older names (before 1996)

Structure

Services
 Economy Service: It is a non-AC bus service with 3+2 non-reclining seater seats built on single-axle Ashok Leyland or Tata chassis with an old green-cream livery or a new blue-grey livery.
 Economy AC Service: It is a AC bus service with 3+2 non-reclining seater seats built on single-axle Ashok Leyland or Tata chassis with a new dark blue livery.
 Superfast Service (SFS): It is a non-AC bus service with 3+2 non-reclining seater seats built on single-axle Ashok Leyland or Tata chassis with select few stops and a new blue-grey livery.
 Superfast Service AC (SFS AC): It is an AC bus service with 3+2 non-reclining seater seats built on single-axle Ashok Leyland or Tata chassis with select few stops and a new dark blue livery.
 Point to Point Service (PP): It is a non-AC bus service with 3+2 non-reclining seater seats built on single-axle Ashok Leyland or Tata chassis with no stops in between and a new blue-grey livery.
 Point to Point AC (PP AC): It is an AC bus service with 3+2 non-reclining seater seats built on single-axle Ashok Leyland or Tata chassis with no stops in between and a new dark blue livery.
 Ordinary City Service: It is a non-AC bus service with 2+2 bench type non-reclining seater seats built on single-axle Ashok Leyland chassis with an old red-cream livery.
 Deluxe City Service: It is a non-AC bus service with 2+2 non-reclining seater seats built on single-axle Ashok Leyland or Tata chassis with lesser stops and a new red livery.
 Deluxe City AC Service: It is an AC bus service with 2+2 non-reclining seater seats built on single-axle Ashok Leyland or Tata chassis with lesser stops and a new red-grey livery.

Other ventures
In 1984, Tamil Nadu State Transport Corporation Limited established Institute of Road and Transport Technology in Erode. In 2013, Tamil Nadu State Transport Corporation Limited established Amma Kudineer (Amma packaged drinking water) which is involved in the production and packaging of mineral water in one-litre plastic bottles, and selling them in long-distance running state-owned buses and in bus stations. The price has been fixed at ₹10 per bottle, and the production plant is set up in Gummidipoondi in Thiruvallur district. This venture is closed

References

External links

 State Transport Undertakings
 TNSTC

Bus companies of India
Transport in Tamil Nadu
State road transport corporations of India
Government agencies established in 1972
Government-owned companies of India
1972 establishments in Tamil Nadu